Dronevil is the eighth studio album by the Japanese experimental band Boris. It is a double album: the first LP, Drone, showcases a more ambient sound, while the second LP, Evil, showcases a heavy guitar-oriented doom metal sound. Though the two sides can be heard separately, the original intention is for both to be played simultaneously.

The album was originally released on double vinyl with the artwork for this release done by Stephen O'Malley of Sunn O))). 1,000 copies were pressed of this album, 200 of which were printed on grey vinyl with the other 800 copies pressed on black vinyl.

The album was re-released through Inoxia Records in 2006 under the name Dronevil -Final- on (double) CD format, remastered by Jason Lescalleet. This version includes two additional tracks not found on the original release.

An alternate mix of "The Evil One Which Sobs"/"Interference Demon" appears on Heavy Metal Me, while a live version appears on Archive II.

Track listing

Personnel
 Atsuo - Drums
 Takeshi - Guitar and Bass
 Wata - Guitar and Effects
 Stephen O'Malley - Design
 Enju Tanahashi - Executive Producer
 Mixed and mastered by Souichirou Nakamura
 Produced by Boris
 Recorded By Fangs Anal Satan

Pressing history

References

External links
 
 Aversion Online Review

Boris (band) albums
2005 albums